Sofja Stepčenko (born 21 December 2006) is a Latvian figure skater. She is the 2022 Latvia Trophy and 2023 Volvo Open Cup champion. She placed eleventh at the 2023 European Championships.

Career

Early years 
Stepčenko competed in the advanced novice category for two seasons and then moved up to the junior ranks. She made her ISU Junior Grand Prix (JGP) debut in September 2021.

2022–23 season 
Stepčenko began her season on the JGP series, appearing at two events. In November, making her senior international debut, she placed fourth at the Volvo Open Cup and seventh at the Tallinn Trophy. Her first senior international medal, gold, came in December 2022 at the Latvia Trophy. The second-best Latvian woman at the event was Angelīna Kučvaļska, who finished in fifth place.

Stepčenko was nominated to represent Latvia at the 2023 European Championships, which took place in January in Helsinki, Finland. Ranked 14th in the short program, she qualified to the free skate and climbed to 11th overall. This is the best European result by a Latvian woman since Kučvaļska's fourth place at the 2016 edition.

Programs

Competitive highlights 
GP: Grand Prix; CS: Challenger Series; JGP: Junior Grand Prix

References

External links 
 
 

2006 births
Latvian female single skaters
Living people
Sportspeople from Riga